The Transat Jacques Vabre is a yachting race that follows the historic coffee trading route between France and Brazil. It is named after (and sponsored by) a French brand of coffee.

The course was drawn up back in 1993 to follow in the wake of the clippers transporting coffee from Brazil to France. The Transat Jacques Vabre is a major date on the calendar, taking place every other year in odd years. It is a two-person race and the pairs of sailors are formed according to their complementary skills, what they have in common and how they get on. Boats leave from Le Havre, France's leading coffee importing port, going to Salvador de Bahia, in Brazil, the world's leading coffee grower and exporter (4335 miles). The first edition in 1993 was a single handed race.

The event is open to multihulls and monohulls from the following classes: Ultims (multihulls between 70 and 105 feet), IMOCA (60 feet monohulls), Multi 50 and Class40. All kinds of navigational aids are allowed in particular for routing, except for the Class40 boats (as this is forbidden in their own rules).

Winners

IMOCA 60 - Winners

1993 1st Edition
The first edition was a single handed race between Le Havre and Cartagena (Colombia). 13 boats started.
 1st multihull: Paul Vatine on Région Haute-Normandie.
 1st monohull: Yves Parlier on Cacolac d'Aquitaine.

ORMA 60 Multihulls

IMOCA 60

1995
A two-handed race between Le Havre and Cartagena.
 1st multihull: Paul Vatine and Roland Jourdain on Région Haute-Normandie.
 1st monohull: Jean Maurel and Fred Dahirel on Côte d'Or.

Classements 	Skippers     	 Bateaux     	Temps de course

ORMA

IMOCA 60

1997
Again a two-handed race between Le Havre and Cartagena.
 1st multihull: Laurent and Yvan Bourgnon on Primagaz.
 1st monohull: Yves Parlier and Éric Tabarly on Aquitaine Innovations.

60ft Multihulls

IMOCA 60

50ft Multi

50ft Monohull

1999
This year was marked by the disappearance of Paul Vatine, on board the Groupe André.
 1st multihull : Loïck Peyron and Franck Proffit on Fujicolor.
 1st monohull : Thomas Coville and Hervé Jan on Sodebo.

Multihulls

IMOCA 60

IMOCA 50

2001
A two-handed race between Le Havre and Salvador de Bahia (Brazil). There was a total of 22 boats in 3 classes of boats.
1 out of 14 multihull 60: Franck Cammas and Steve Ravussin on Groupama.
1 out of 12 monohull 60: Roland Jourdain and Gaël Le Cléac'h on Sill Pleint Fruit.
1 out of 17 monohull 50: Alex Bennett and Paul Larsen on One Dream.

ORMA

IMOCA 60

Classe 2

2003
From this year there have been 4 categories of boats and 38 competitors.
Ross.

60ft Multihulls

IMOCA 60

50ft Multihulls

50ft Monohulls

2005
The start was 5 November for the monohulls and 6 November for the multihulls.

1st multihull 60 feet (class 1): Pascal Bidégorry and Lionel Lemonchois (France)
1st multihull 50 feet (class 2): Franck-Yves Escoffier and Kevin Escoffier on Crêpes Whaou
1st monohull 60 feet (class 1): Jean-Pierre Dick and Loïck Peyron on Virbac Paprec
1st monohull 50 feet (class 2): Joe Harris and Josh Hall on Gryphon Solo

Multi 60 Orma

IMOCA 60

Multi Classe 2

Mono Classe 2

2007
The start was 3 November for the monohulls and 4 November for the multihulls from Le Havre. This year, 60 boats were registered.

1st multihull 60: Franck Cammas and Steve Ravussin on Groupama 2 in 10 days, 38 minutes and 43 seconds: Record of the Race
1st monohull 60: Michel Desjoyeaux and Emmanuel Le Borgne on Foncia in 17 days, 2 hours, 37 minutes and 5 seconds
1st multihull 50: Franck-Yves Escoffier and Karine Fauconnier on Crêpes Whaou in 15 days, 22 hours, 27 minutes and 37 seconds
1st monohull 40: Giovanni Soldini and Pietro d'Ali on Telecom Italia in 22 days, 13 hours, 2 minutes and 22 seconds

ORMA

IMOCA 60

Multi 50

Class 40

2009 
The start was 8 November and course was from Le Havre to Puerto Limon (Costa Rica).
Winners Marc Guillemot and Charles Caudrelier on Safran (IMOCA).

Multi50

2011 
The start was 2 November and course was from Le Havre to Puerto Limon (Costa Rica).
On a northerly route, Jean- Pierre Dick and Jérémie BEYOU won cleanly, setting a new IMOCA reference time of 15 days 18 hours 15 minutes and 54 seconds. Only 20 of the 35 starters finished the race.

IMOCA 60

Multi50

Class40

2013 

Le Havre to Itajaí. Storm Force 10 winds in the English Channel caused the postponement of the start to 7 November.
The race was won by the MOD 70 Edmond de Rothschild skippered by Sebastien Josse and Charles Caudrelier. First monohull was PRB skippered by Vincent Riou and Jean Le Cam.

MOD70

Multi 50

IMOCA

Class 40

2015 
The 2015 race departed on 25 October, with 42 registered boats.
1st ULTIM: 
1st Multi 50: 
1st Class 40:

Ultime

Multi 50

IMOCA 60

Class 40

2017 

1st ULTIM: Thomas Coville and Jean-Luc Nelias on Sodebo Ultim in 7 days, 22 hours, 7 minutes and 27 seconds: Record of the Race
1st IMOCA 60: Jean-Pierre Dick and Yann Elies on St Michel - Vibrac in 13 days, 7 hours, 36 minutes and 46 seconds
1st Multi 50: Lalou Roucayrol and Alex Pella on Arkema in 10 days, 19 hours, 14 minutes and 19 seconds
1st Class 40: Maxime Sorel and Antoine Carpentier on V and B in 17 days, 10 hours, 44 minutes and 15 seconds

Ultim

IMOCA 60

Multi 50

Class 40

2019 

The 2019 edition raced from Le Havre, France, to Salvador de Bahia, Brazil.

IMOCA 60

Multi 50

Class 40

2021 
The 2021 edition raced from Le Havre, France, to Fort de France, Martinique.
1st ULTIM: 5 Starters
1st IMOCA 60: 22 Starters
1st Multi 50: 7 Starters
1st Class 40: 45 Starters

Ultime Multihulls

IMOCA 60

Multi 50

Class 40

References

External links 

Pascal Bidégorry website, 2005 winner
Franck Cammas website, 2001, 2003 and 2007 winner
Transat 2009 website

Recurring events established in 1993
Transatlantic sailing competitions
Yachting races
Sailing competitions in Brazil
Sailing competitions in France
Two person offshore sailing event